Triton is a programming language and compiler for writing highly-efficient, custom deep-learning primitives developed by OpenAI.

The aim of Triton is to provide an open-source environment to write fast code at higher productivity than CUDA, but also with higher flexibility than other existing DSLs.

Compatibility

Supported platforms
 Linux

Supported hardware
 Nvidia GPUs (Compute Capability 7.0+)
 Under development: AMD GPUs, CPUs

Python (programming language) implementations

References